Bluebells School International is a secondary school in Kailash, New Delhi, India,  under the leadership of Mrs Manju Sethi (principal), Mrs. Suman Kumar (director), and Mrs G. Soni (founder). The school was established in 1957, by Mrs. Mari Guha. It has international exchange programs with France, Australia, Mexico, Japan, Germany and Spain.

Philosophy
The school motto is One planet, the Earth; One family, Mankind. Activities in support of this philosophy have included commemoration of Hiroshima Day jointly with Japanese students, participation in a campaign against communal violence in Gujarat and organizing sporting events against embassy schools. In contrast to many private schools in Delhi, Bluebells School International accepts blind students.

Facilities
Libraries 

The school has libraries for the primary and senior sections. The school subscribes to 100 periodicals and newspapers. Literary activities like Quiz, Story Telling, Book Reviews and Creative Expressions are encouraged. Senior Library has a research centre.

Laboratories
 
There are laboratories for Physics, Chemistry, Biology and Home Science.

Auditorium 

The auditorium can seat 400 people. Its multi-purpose usage is assembly functions, lesson enrichment and a lecture room.

A.V. room

The audio-visual room has OHP, slide projector and screens. It has a collection of educational CDs and DVDs.

School clinic

There is a sick room attended by a full-time nurse.

Multimedia centre 

Artwork, photography, and documentaries are produced in the school.

Computer laboratories  

There are two computer labs.

Science park 
 
This was inaugurated by Bharat Ratna and former president Dr. A.P.J. Abdul Kalam in 2002. It helps students learn science through experiments.

Dance halls 

The school has two halls for Indian and Western dance.

Art gallery 

Exhibitions on socially important issues are held here. 

Language Laboratory

The Language Laboratory has provision to seat 40 students. Classes are conducted in French, Japanese, Russian, Spanish, Chinese and German.

References
https://www.edustoke.com/gurugram/blue-bells-model-school-sector-10

External links
 Official site

Schools in Delhi